This is a list of South African television related events from 2006.

Events
25 March - Radio DJ Zuraida Jardine and her partner Michael Wentink win the first season of Strictly Come Dancing.
28 May - The Afrikaans version of Idols South Africa debuts on KykNet.
28 August - Dewald Louw wins the first season of the Afrikaans version of Idols.
23 September - Television handyman Riaan Venter and his partner Hayley Hammond win the second season of Strictly Come Dancing.

Debuts

Domestic
4 February - Strictly Come Dancing (2006-2008, 2013–2015)
Cool Catz (e.tv) (2006–present)

International
17 January -  Prison Break (M-Net)
3 April -  Boston Legal (M-Net Series)
28 June -  My Name Is Earl (M-Net)
29 June -  Bones (SABC3)
2 July -  Planet Earth (SABC3)
2 October -  Blue Murder (SABC1)
12 November -  Big Love (M-Net)
 The Buzz on Maggie (e.tv)
 Gordon the Garden Gnome (M-Net)
 Trollz (SABC1)

Changes of network affiliation

Television shows

1980s
Good Morning South Africa (1985–present)
Carte Blanche (1988–present)

1990s
Top Billing (1992–present)
Generations (1994–present)
Isidingo (1998–present)

2000s
Idols South Africa (2002–present)

Ending this year

Births

See also
2006 in South Africa

Deaths